The 2002–03 season marked Watford Football Club's third consecutive season in the Football League First Division, following relegation from the Premier League in the 1999–2000 season. The club was managed by its former reserve team manager Ray Lewington, following the dismissal of Gianluca Vialli at the end of 2001–02. The club finished 13th in the First Division, reached the semi-final of the FA Cup, and were eliminated in the first round of the League Cup. Watford were operating under severe financial constraints following the collapse of ITV Digital, and at the end of the season were forced to offload several first-team players, including Tommy Smith, Gifton Noel-Williams, Stephen Glass, and record signing Allan Nielsen.

Season review
Over the summer many of the Vialli's signings left the club. Lewington had few funds to strengthen the side. The extent of Watford's financial difficulties was exposed in the autumn, along with many League clubs, following the collapse of ITV Digital. The club was facing administration when the players and staff agreed a 12% wage deferral. Exacerbating the club's difficulties were the large payoffs they had had to make to Vialli and several players on terminating their contracts, and Vialli's decision to sue the club early in 2003. The club started the season well, however, despite the players having to agree to a pay-cut during October, and finished in mid-table. An unexpected run to the FA Cup semi-final, where Watford lost to Premiership Southampton, also generated vital cash.

Final league table

Results
Watford's score comes first

Legend

Football League First Division

FA Cup

League Cup

Players

First-team squad
Squad at end of season

Left club during season

Reserve squad

See also
 Luton Town F.C. and Watford F.C. rivalry
 List of Watford F.C. seasons

References

Notes

2002-03
Watford